Athletic Club Sodigraf is a Congolese football club based in Kinshasa. Their home games are played at Stade des Martyrs.

Achievements
African Cup Winners' Cup
Finalist : 1996
Coupe du Congo: 1
1995

Performance in CAF competitions
CAF Cup Winners' Cup: 1 appearance
1996 – Finalist

Notable players
 Adu Bikele, former national under-17 player
 Diangi Mbala, former national under-17 player

References

Football clubs in the Democratic Republic of the Congo
Football clubs in Kinshasa
Association football clubs established in 1989
1989 establishments in Zaire